Tillandsia stipitata is a species of flowering plant in the genus Tillandsia. This species is native to Venezuela.

References

stipitata
Flora of Venezuela